52nd CAS Awards
February 20, 2016

Motion Picture – Live Action: 
The Revenant
Motion Picture – Animated: 
Inside Out

The 52nd Cinema Audio Society Awards were held on February 20, 2016, in the Bunker Hill Ballroom of the OMNI Los Angeles Hotel at California Plaza, Los Angeles, honoring outstanding achievements in sound mixing in film and television of 2015.

Winners and nominees

12th CAS Technical Achievement Award
 Production: Sound Devices, LLC – SL6
 Post-production: iZotope – RX5

References

2015 film awards
2015 guild awards
Cinema Audio Society Awards
2016 in American cinema